Anatoly Mikhaylin (born 19 August 1958) is a Russian sailor. He competed in the Star event at the 1996 Summer Olympics.

References

External links
 

1958 births
Living people
Russian male sailors (sport)
Olympic sailors of Russia
Sailors at the 1996 Summer Olympics – Star
Place of birth missing (living people)